The Korea Advanced Institute of Science and Technology (KAIST) is a national research university located in Daedeok Innopolis, Daejeon, South Korea. KAIST was established by the Korean government in 1971 as the nation's first public, research-oriented science and engineering institution. KAIST is considered to be one of the most prestigious universities in the nation. KAIST has been internationally accredited in business education, and hosting the Secretariat of the Association of Asia-Pacific Business Schools (AAPBS). KAIST has 10,504 full-time students and 1,342 faculty researchers (as of Fall 2019 Semester) and had a total budget of US$765 million in 2013, of which US$459 million was from research contracts.

In 2007, KAIST partnered with international institutions and adopted dual degree programs for its students. Its partner institutions include the Technical University of Denmark, Carnegie Mellon University, the Georgia Institute of Technology, the Technical University of Berlin, and the Technical University of Munich.

History

The institute was founded in 1971 as the Korea Advanced Institute of Science (KAIS) by a loan of US$6 million (US$38 million 2019) from the United States Agency for International Development (USAID) and supported by President Park Chung-Hee. The institute's academic scheme was mainly designed by Frederick E. Terman, then vice president of Stanford University, and Chung Geum-mo, a professor at the Polytechnic Institution of Brooklyn. The institute's two main functions were to train advanced scientists and engineers and develop a structure of graduate education in the country. Research studies had begun by 1973 and undergraduates studied for bachelor's degrees by 1984.

In 1981 the government merged the Korean Advanced Institute of Science and the Korean Institute of Science and Technology (KIST) to form the Korea Advanced Institute of Science and Technology, or KAIST. Due to differing research philosophies, KIST and KAIST split in 1989. In the same year KAIST and the Korea Institute of Technology (KIT) combined and moved from Seoul to the Daedeok Science Town in Daejeon. 
The first act of President Suh upon his inauguration in July 2006 was to lay out the KAIST Development Plan. The ‘KAIST Development Five-Year Plan’ was finalized on February 5, 2007, by KAIST Steering Committee. The goals of KAIST set by Suh were to become one of the best science and technology universities in the world, and to become one of the top-10 universities by 2011. In January 2008, the university dropped its full name, Korea Advanced Institute of Science and Technology, and changed its official name to only KAIST.

Timeline

Academics

Academics

Admission to KAIST is based on overall grades, grades on math and science courses, recommendation letters from teachers, study plan, personal statements, and other data, and does not rely on a standardized test conducted by the university. In 2014, the acceptance rate for local students was 14.9%, and for international students at 13.2%.

Full scholarships are given to all students including international students in the bachelor, master and doctorate courses. Doctoral students are given military-exemption benefits from South Korea's compulsory military service. Up to 80% of courses taught in KAIST are conducted in English.

Undergraduate students can join the school through an “open major system” that allows students to take classes for three terms and then choose a discipline that suits their aptitude, and undergraduates are allowed to change their major anytime. KAIST has also produced many doctorates through the integrated master's and doctoral program and early-completion system. Students must publish papers in internationally renowned academic journals for graduation.

Students
KAIST produced 69,388 alumni from 1975 to 2021, with 19,457 bachelor's, 35,513 master's, and 14,418 doctorate degree holders. As of Spring 2021, 10,793 students were enrolled in KAIST with 3,605 bachelor's, 3,069 master's, 1,354 joint M.S.-Ph.D.'s, and 2,765 doctoral students. More than 70 percent of KAIST undergraduates come from specialized science high schools. 817 international students from 81 countries are studying at KAIST (as of spring semester 2021), making it one of the most ethnically diverse universities in the country.

Organization
KAIST is organized into 6 colleges, 2 schools and 33 departments/divisions.

 College of Natural Sciences
Department of Physics
Department of Mathematical Sciences
Department of Chemistry
Graduate School of Nanoscience and Technology
College of Life Science and Bioengineering
Department of Biological Sciences
Graduate School of Medical Science and Engineering
College of Engineering
School of Mechanical and Aerospace Engineering
Department of Mechanical Engineering
Department of Aerospace Engineering
School of Electrical Engineering
School of Computing
Department of Civil and Environmental Engineering
Department of Bio and Brain Engineering
Department of Industrial Design
Department of Industrial and Systems Engineering
Graduate School of Data Science
Department of Chemical and Biomolecular Engineering
Department of Materials Science and Engineering
Department of Nuclear and Quantum Engineering
Department of Information and Communications Engineering
The Cho Chun Shik Graduate School of Green Transportation
Graduate School of EEWS (Energy, Environment, Water, and Sustainability)
Graduate School of AI (GSAI)
College of Liberal Arts and Convergence Science
School of Digital Humanities and Computational Social Sciences
Graduate School of Culture Technology
Moon Soul Graduate School of Future Strategy (Korean only)
Graduate School of Science and Technology Policy
College of Business
MS/Ph.D
School of Business and Technology Management
School of Management Engineering
Graduate School of Finance
Graduate School of Information and Media Management
Graduate School of Green Growth
School of Transdisciplinary Studies

KAIST also has three affiliated institutes including the Korea Institute of Advanced Study (KIAS), National NanoFab Center (NNFC), and Korea Science Academy (KSA).

Campus 

KAIST has two campuses in Daejeon and one campus in Seoul. The university is mainly located in the Daedeok Science Town in the city of Daejeon, 150 kilometers south of the capital Seoul. Daedeok is also home to some 50 public and private research institutes, universities such as CNU and high-tech venture capital companies.

Most lectures, research activities, and housing services are located in the Daejeon main campus. It has a total of 29 dormitories. Twenty-three dormitories for male students and four dormitories for female students are located on the outskirts of the campus, and two apartments for married students are located outside the campus.

The Seoul campus is the home of the Business Faculty of the university. The graduate schools of finance, management and information & media management are located there.

The Munji campus, the former campus of Information and Communications University until its merger with KAIST, is located ca.  away from the main campus. It has two dormitories, one for undergraduate students and the other for graduate students. The Institute for Basic Science (IBS) Center for Axion and Precision Physics Research is located here doing particle and nuclear physics related to dark matter and the Rare Isotope Science Project has the Superconducting Radio Frequency test facility.

Main library 
The KAIST main library was established in 1971 as KAIS library, and it went through a merge and separation process with KIST library. It merged with KIT in March 1990. A contemporary 5 story building was constructed as the main library, and it is being operated with an annex library. The library uses the American LC Classification Schedule.

The library underwent expansion and remodeling, which finished in 2018, to include conference rooms, collaboration rooms, and media rooms.

Event 
KAIST's Seokrim Taeulje is a festival held by KAIST for three days every spring semester. The festival preparation committee under the undergraduate student council will be in charge of planning and execution, various food booths and experience booths will be opened, and stage events such as club performances and a song festival will be held. Also called the Cherry Blossom Festival, students eat strawberries on the lawn.

Research
Seven KAIST Institutes (KIs) have been set up: the KI for the BioCentury, the KI for Information Technology Convergence, the KI for the Design of Complex Systems, the KI for Entertainment Engineering, the KI for the NanoCentury, the KI for Eco-Energy, and the KI for Urban Space and Systems. Each KI is operated as an independent research center at the level of a college, receiving support in terms of finance and facilities. In terms of ownership of intellectual property rights, KAIST holds 2,694 domestic patents and 723 international patents so far.

Electric vehicles 
Researchers at KAIST have developed the Online Electric Vehicle (OLEV), a technique of powering vehicles through cables underneath the surface of the road via non-contact magnetic charging (a power source is placed underneath the road surface and power is wirelessly picked up on the vehicle itself).

Autonomous arms
In February 2018, the Korea Times published an article which stated that KAIST was starting an AI weapons research project together with the Korean arms manufacturer Hanwa. The allegations were of developing lethal autonomous weapons with Hanwa. This has led to researchers from 30 countries boycotting KAIST, which has denied existence of the program.

Academic rankings

In 2019 Thomson Reuters named KAIST the 34th most innovative university in the world and the 2nd most innovative university in the Asia Pacific region. In 2022 QS World University Rankings ranked KAIST 41st overall in the world and 12th within Asia, coming 16th in Material Sciences and 16th in Engineering and Technology. In the 2009 THE-QS World University Rankings (in 2010 Times Higher Education World University Rankings and QS World University Rankings parted ways to produce separate rankings) for Engineering & IT, the university was placed 21st in the world and 1st in Korea and was placed 69th overall. KAIST was again recognized as a number one University in Korea by JoongAng Ilbo Review. In the year of 2009, KAIST's department of industrial design has also been listed in the top 30 Design Schools by Business Week. KAIST ranked the best university in Republic of Korea and the 7th university in Asia in the Top 100 Asian Universities list, the first regional ranking issued by THE-QS World Rankings.

QS University Subject Rankings (2017):
 13th, materials science
 15th, civil engineering and structural engineering
 15th, mechanical engineering
 15th, chemical engineering
 17th, electrical engineering
 18th, chemistry
 33rd, computer science and information systems
 44th, Physics & Astronomy
 47th, Mathematics

Times Higher Education ranked KAIST the 3rd best university in the world under the age of 50 years in its 2015 league table.

Notable faculty and staff

Soon-dal Choi, electrical engineer; successfully developed and launched a satellite, KITSAT-3
Dong-ho Cho, electrical engineer; developed online electric vehicle (OLEV), listed on Time Magazine's top fifty inventions of 2010
Jun-ho Choi, discoverer of hSNF5 body protein involved in reproduction of Papilloma virus
Yang-Kyu Choi, developed world's smallest terabyte flash memory
Cho Zang-hee, developed PET Imaging while at Colombia, developed Imaging for MRI/PET/CAT at KAIS, Later KAIST
James D. Cumming, Foreign Guest Professor, published first paper with Cho Zang-hee on MRI Imaging resolution improvement.
Heun Lee, identified mechanism behind hydrogen storage in ice particles
Ji-O Lee, chemist; identified structure of protein causing sepsis
Sang-yup Lee, developed chip to diagnose Wilson's disease
Gi-hyong Gho, mathematician; developed world's first public key crypto system (PKCS) technology
Jong-kyong Jeong, identified cause of Parkinson's disease
Eunseong Kim, physicist; discovered new evidence for the existence of a supersolid
Jin-woo Kim, identified the cause behind senile retinal degeneration disease
Se-jin Kwan, aerospace engineer; successfully developed and tested a moon lander
Chang Hee Nam, physicist; developed attosecond pulse generation and compression technology
Gweng-su Rhim, developed next generation Transparent Resistive Random Access Memory (TRRAM)
Seung-man Yang, developed new photonics crystal-based optofluidic technology
Yoon-tae Young, physicist; first to observe proper function of complexin protein to control neuron communication
Giltsu Choi, photobiologist; identified key genes regulating seed germination in response to light in plants.
Dan Keun Sung, electronic engineer

Notable alumni

Academia
Ryong Ryoo, chemist

Science and technology
Yi So-Yeon, first Korean to fly in space
Tony Kim, founder of ProtoPie

Business
Sung-kyun Na, founder and CEO of Neowiz, Korea's first internet supplier (KAIST graduate school)
Jungju Kim, NEXON CEO
Hae-jin Lee, Next Human Network (NHN Corporation)
Chang-han Kim, PUBG CEO

Entertainment 
 So-jung Kim, Singer
 Jang-won Lee, Singer (Peppertones)
 Jae-pyung Shin, Singer (Peppertones)
 So-hee Yoon, Actress

Notes and references 
 The Times-QS World University Rankings 2009 - KAIST 69th overall, 21st in the field of Engineering/Technology

See also
 Education in Korea
 List of national universities in South Korea
 List of universities and colleges in South Korea

External links

 
 

 
Daejeon
National universities and colleges in South Korea
Engineering universities and colleges in South Korea
1971 establishments in South Korea
Educational institutions established in 1971